Scopula acharis is a moth of the family Geometridae. It was described by Prout in 1938. It is endemic to India.

References

Moths described in 1938
Endemic fauna of India
Moths of Asia
acharis
Taxa named by Louis Beethoven Prout